Myrcia arenicola is a species of plant in the family Myrtaceae. It is endemic to western Cuba.

References

Endemic flora of Cuba
arenicola
Critically endangered plants
Taxonomy articles created by Polbot